American country artist Loretta Lynn released 86 singles, two B-sides and 14 music videos. Her debut single was "I'm a Honky Tonk Girl" (1960) via Zero Records. Promoting the song with her husband by driving to each radio station, the effort paid off when it peaked at number fourteen on the Billboard Hot Country Songs chart. Arriving in Nashville, Tennessee, that year, she signed a recording contract with Decca Records. In 1962, "Success" reached the sixth position on the country songs chart, starting a series of top ten hits including "Wine Women and Song" and "Blue Kentucky Girl". She began collaborating with Ernest Tubb in 1964 and recorded four hit singles with him, including "Mr. and Mrs. Used to Be". Lynn's popularity greatly increased in 1966 when she began releasing her own compositions as singles. Among the first was "You Ain't Woman Enough (To Take My Man)" which reached the second position on the country songs list. She then reached the number one spot with "Don't Come Home A-Drinkin' (With Lovin' on Your Mind)" (1967). This was followed by "Fist City" (1968) and "Woman of the World (Leave My World Alone)" (1969).

Lynn released the autobiographical single "Coal Miner's Daughter" in 1970, topping the Billboard country songs survey and becoming her first entry on the Billboard Hot 100, peaking at number eighty-three. The following year, "I Wanna Be Free" also charted among the Hot 100 and reached the third position on the Hot Country Songs list. The same year, "One's on the Way" became Lynn's fifth number one single, later followed by "Rated "X"" (1972), "Love Is the Foundation" (1973), and "Trouble in Paradise" (1974). "The Pill" (1975) reached number five on the country songs chart and was her highest-charting solo single on the Billboard Hot 100, reaching number seventy. "Somebody Somewhere (Don't Know What He's Missin' Tonight)" reached the top of the country songs chart in 1976 and she reached the same position with "She's Got You" (1977), a cover of Patsy Cline's original single. The title track from Out of My Head and Back in My Bed (1978) was Lynn's final single to peak at the number one spot.

Lynn's singles in the 1980s reached lower chart positions as the country music industry changed. Her 1982 single "I Lie" became her final top ten hit on the Billboard country chart. In 1985, "Heart Don't Do This to Me" became her final top-twenty and final top-forty hit. After charting with the single "Who Was That Stranger" (1988), Lynn's recording career went into hiatus. She briefly returned in 1993 to collaborate with Dolly Parton and Tammy Wynette on the studio album Honky Tonk Angels. The project's only single "Silver Threads and Golden Needles" reached number sixty eight on the Billboard country chart. "Country in My Genes" was spawned from Still Country (2000), Lynn's first studio album following the death of her husband. The single reached number seventy two on the Hot Country Songs chart. Lynn collaborated with Sheryl Crow and Miranda Lambert in 2010 to re-record "Coal Miner's Daughter", which was released as a single in September.

Singles

1960s

1970s

1980s

1990s–2020s

Other charted songs

Music videos

Notes

References

External links
 Loretta Lynn singles discography at Discogs

Country music discographies
Discographies of American artists
 Discography